The Vernon Pugh Award for Distinguished Service, previously called the IRB Distinguished Service Award, is awarded by World Rugby at the World Rugby Awards. It has been awarded annually since 2001. It honours an individual, Union or group, male or female, who has given outstanding service to their country and contributed to the International Game in as many as possible of the following areas: Playing, Coaching, Management, Training, Administration, Media & Broadcast.

Recipients

References

External links
World Rugby Awards

World Rugby Awards